Ochthochloa is a genus of desert plants in the grass family native to the Sahara and Arabian Deserts. The only known species is Ochthochloa compressa, whose native range extends from Algeria to Uttarakhand.

References

Chloridoideae
Monotypic Poaceae genera
Flora of North Africa
Flora of Asia